Trinità d'Agultu e Vignola is a comune (municipality) in the Province of Sassari in the Italian region Sardinia, located about  north of Cagliari and about  west of Olbia.

Trinità d'Agultu e Vignola borders the following municipalities: Aggius, Aglientu, Badesi, Viddalba. The main economical activity is summer tourism.

References

Cities and towns in Sardinia
1958 establishments in Italy
States and territories established in 1958